Das Beste, German for "The Best", may refer to:

 Das Beste, an album by Adoro, 2013
 Das Beste, an album by Culcha Candela, 2010
 Das Beste, an album by Daniela Alfinito, 2016
 Das Beste, an album by Seer, 2002
 "Das Beste", a song by Duett, competing to represent Germany in the Eurovision Song Contest 1988 and Austria in the Eurovision Song Contest 1990

See also
 Best (disambiguation), including uses of The Best